In the Basement is a live album by The Pharaohs which was recorded in 1972 and released on the Luv N' Haight record label in 1996.

Track listing
"In the Basement" [live]                 (The Pharaohs, Don Whitehead)                    10:50  
"People Make the World Go Round" [live]  (Thom Bell, Linda Creed)                             11:18  
"African Roots" [live]                     (L. Brown, T. Brown)                             7:57  
"The Pharaohs Love Y'All"                (Charles Handy, The Pharaohs, Louis Satterfield, Fred Walker)     5:09 
"Drum Suite" [live]                      (Kewu Gogins Oya, Alfred Nalls, The Pharaohs, Fred Walker)  10:49  
"Love and Happiness"                 (Al Green, Teenie Hodges)                            3:01

Personnel
The Pharaohs
Sue "Sulanya" Conway - vocals
Ealee Satterfield - bass, cowbell, vocals
Don "Hippmo" - alto, tenor and baritone saxophone, flute cowbell
Warren Bingham - guitar
"Big" Willie Woods - trombone, baritone horns, Indian snake charmer flute
Rahmlee Michael Davis - trumpet
Shango Njoko Adefumi - African drums, congas, gong, vocals
Oye Bisi Nalls - African drums, cowbell, congas, tambourine
Kewu "Gogins" Oya - quinto drums, congas
Derrick Morris - trap drums

References

The Pharaohs albums
1996 live albums